The Sex Discrimination Act 1975 (c. 65) was an Act of the Parliament of the United Kingdom which protected men and women from discrimination on the grounds of sex or marital status. The Act concerned employment, training, education, harassment, the provision of goods and services, and the disposal of premises.

The Sex Discrimination (Gender Reassignment) Regulations 1999, The Gender Recognition Act 2004 and The Sex Discrimination Act 1975 (Amendment) Regulations 2008 amended parts of this Act to apply to those who "intend to undergo, are undergoing or have undergone gender reassignment".

Other amendments were introduced by the Sex Discrimination Act 1986, the Employment Act 1989, the Equality Act 2006, and other legislation such as rulings by the European Court of Justice.

The Act did not apply in Northern Ireland, however The Sex Discrimination Gender Reassignment Regulations (Northern Ireland) 1999 does.

The Act was repealed in full by the Equality Act 2010.

The Equal Opportunities Commission
The Act established the Equal Opportunities Commission (EOC) whose main duties were to work towards the elimination of discrimination, to promote equality of opportunity between sexes and to keep under review the workings of the Sex Discrimination Act and the Equal Pay Act 1970. The EOC helped  individuals bring cases to Employment Tribunals and to the courts.  The EOC is now subsumed into the Equality and Human Rights Commission (EHRC). ‘Sex Discrimination’, as it is referred to in employment law, was introduced in the 1970s alongside equal pay legislation.

Powers of the Commission
The EHRC was empowered to do the following:

Bring proceedings in respect of certain provisions and seek a court injunction to restrain the repetition of an unlawful act
Commence a claim before an employment tribunal on behalf of an individual.
Give practical guidance and advice to persons who appear to have a complaint under the Acts.

See also
Equality Act 2006
Equality Act 2010
Sex Discrimination Act 1984

References

External links
 Sex Discrimination Act 1975 as originally passed

 The Equal Opportunities Commission now subsumed into the Commission for Equality and Human Rights
 Sex Discrimination (Northern Ireland) Order 1976

United Kingdom Acts of Parliament 1975
Anti-discrimination law in the United Kingdom
Sexism
Gender in the United Kingdom
Transgender law in the United Kingdom
November 1975 events in the United Kingdom
1975 in LGBT history